Neoptychocarpus is a genus of flowering plants belonging to the family Salicaceae.

Its native range is Southern Tropical America.

Species
Species:

Neoptychocarpus apodanthus 
Neoptychocarpus chocoensis 
Neoptychocarpus killipii

References

Salicaceae
Salicaceae genera